Tiril is a given name. Notable people with the given name include:

Tiril Bue (born 1993), Norwegian competitive sailor
Tiril Sjåstad Christiansen (born 1995), Norwegian freestyle skier
Tiril Eckhoff (born 1990), Norwegian biathlete
Tiril Merg (born 1993), Norwegian handball player
Tiril Udnes Weng (born 1996), Norwegian cross-country skier

Norwegian feminine given names